Some Day Waiting Will End is a song from The Girl Behind the Gun with music by Ivan Caryll and lyrics by Guy Bolton and P. G. Wodehouse.  It was published in 1918 by Chappell & Co.

References 

Bibliography
Parker, Bernard S. “World War I Sheet Music: 9,670 Patriotic Songs Published in the United States, 1914-1920, with More Than 600 Covers Illustrated. Jefferson, N.C.: McFarland, 2007.  

1918 songs
Songs of World War I
Songs with lyrics by P. G. Wodehouse